Eastern Star Schools are founded in 2006 as a private bilingual school in Vientiane, Laos. Its name was Eastern Star Bilingual School, and this name changed in 2016 to the current name, Eastern Star Schools. School offers coed education in English and Lao for students age 2 to 18 in three different locations.

School has students and teachers from 30 different nationalities.

HISTORY 
Opened in 2006 by Mr. Yasmun at Nongbone Village of Xaysetha District. Part of the current main campus location was already a private school operated by a local educator. Mr. Yasmun leased the existing building with its students and surrounding land to extend the campus to a modern private school serving from age 2–18 with a bilingual curriculum. At the same time, Eastern Star Schools operated an international kindergarten called Eastern Star International Kindergarten Watnak at the Watnak Village of Sissatanak District.

A three-story lecture hall with 2 science labs, 1 ICT lab, 27 classrooms and 4 offices completed and start serving students in 2012.

In 2015, Eastern Star Schools opened first English medium International School of the Southern Laos at the Pakse.

In 2016, Eastern Star International Kindergarten Watnak moved to a bigger campus in a closer neighborhood and its name changed to Eastern Star International School Thongkan and primary section was added.

School also owner and operator of one of the Lao Premier League’s football club called Eastern Star FC.

International Achievements

For last five years, school joins international competitions such as Science Olympiads, Math Competitions, Computer Project Competitions and Football Tournaments. Below is the list of achievements:

Annual Public Events 
School hosts 4 annual public events which is either open to public's view or can join as competitor. Oldest of these events is ISMO (Inter School Math Olympiad). The others are:

·        International Culture Day

·        Science Fair

·        Streetball tournament

Curriculum 
Offers Cambridge International Schools Curriculum for Primary, Secondary and High School

Accreditation 
In the summer of 2016, Eastern Star Schools Executive Committee started international recognition and accreditation initiative. Under this initiative school become a Cambridge International Schools member. Also, under this initiative WASC (Western Association of Schools and Colleges) accreditation process started.

Extra Curricular Events 

-      Camp nights

-      College and Leadership Preparation Program

-      ECO Schools

-      Academic Olympiad and competition teams

Athletics 
The department staff consists of a professional football player from South Africa, an AFC A level football coach and nation's one of the most famous professional basketball player. School joins boys and girls basketball and football tournaments within Vientiane.

External links 
Official Website

Schools in Laos
Education in Laos
Educational organizations based in Laos